Stričići is a village in the municipality of Banja Luka, Republika Srpska, Bosnia and Herzegovina.

See also
 Petar Kočić

References

Villages in Republika Srpska
Populated places in Banja Luka